Stout is a surname. Notable people with the surname include:

Alan Stout (1900-1983), British-Australian philosopher
Alan Stout (1932-2018), American composer
Anna Stout (1858–1931), New Zealand reformer and activist
Archie Stout (1886-1973), American cinematographer
Arlow Stout (1876-1957), American botanist
Arthur Purdy Stout, (1885-1967), American surgeon and pathologist
Barry Stout (1936-2016), American politician
Bill Stout (1927-1989), an American journalist
Byron G. Stout (1829-1896), American politician
Cameron Stout (born 1971), winner of Big Brother 4 UK in 2003
Chris Stout (born 1976), British musician
Eric Stout (born 1993), American baseball player
Frank Stout (rugby union) MC (1877-1926), English rugby union player
Frank Stout (1926-2012), American artist
George Stout (1860-1944), British philosopher
Georgianna Stout (born 1967), American graphic designer
Gordon Stout (born 1952), American musician
Herald F. Stout (1903-1987), American Navy admiral
Hosea Stout (1810-1889), American missionary, lawyer and politician
Jacob Stout (1764-1855), American manufacturer and politician
James Huff Stout (1848-1910) American politician and businessman
James Stout (1910-1976), American jockey
Jeffrey Stout (born 1950), American scholar
Jennifer Park Stout (born 1976), American diplomat and businesswoman
Joan Leemhuis-Stout (born 1946), Dutch politician
Jordan Stout (born 1998), American football player
Juanita Kidd Stout (1919-1998), American attorney
Kristie Lu Stout (born 1974), American journalist and news anchor
Lansing Stout (1828-1871), American politician and lawyer
Lori Kay Stout (born 1962), American sculptor
Martha Stout (born 1953), American psychologist and author
Michael Stout (born 1980), American video game designer
Mike Stout, American activist and musician
Mitchell W. Stout (1950-1970), American soldier and Medal of Honor recipient
Penelope Stout (1622-1732), Dutch settler
 Penrose Stout, American architect
Percy Stout (1875-1937), English rugby union player
Pete Stout (1923-1996), American football player
Randall Stout (1958-2014), American architect
Renee Stout (born 1958), American sculptor
Rex Stout (1886-1975), American author
Richard Stout (1836-1896), American sailor and Medal of Honor recipient
Robert Stout (1844-1930), New Zealand politician
Ryan Stout (born 1982), American comedian
Sam Stout (born 1984), Canadian mixed martial artist
Samuel Van Dyke Stout (1786–1850), American politician
Samuel Hollingsworth Stout (1822-1903), American surgeon
Tom Stout (1879-1965), American politician
William Bushnell Stout (1880-1956), American inventor and engineer
William Stout (born 1949), American fantasy artist and illustrator
William Stout (1841-1900), British rower

Surnames of English origin